Wigred (or Wilgred) (died c. 942) was appointed Bishop of Chester-le-Street around 925. He was also known as the Bishop of the Church of St Cuthbert. He attested charters of King Æthelstan between 928 and 934, and the bishopric in his time was probably the greatest landholder between the Tees and the Tyne.

Citations

References

 The Catholic Encyclopedia accessed on 29 August 2007

External links
 

940s deaths
Year of birth unknown
Year of death uncertain
Bishops of Lindisfarne
10th-century English bishops